The Seven Deadly Sins are manga series written and illustrated by Nakaba Suzuki, set in a fictitious  in a time period superficially akin to the European Middle Ages. Likewise superficially, and frequently in ironic or contradictory ways, the series references various traditions, including Christianity (e.g., the Seven Deadly Sins, the Ten Commandments) and the Arthurian legend (e.g., in naming Meliodas, Escanor, Merlin, Diane, Gowther, King, and Ban). The contradictory nature of the names given to the groups and characters is reflected in the emergence of the title group as the protagonists and the group of "Holy Knights" as the antagonists of the series.

In accordance with the medieval theme, many of The Seven Deadly Sins are depicted as knights, broadly construed, who are clad in stylized variations of medieval armor, many of whom perform magic. The five major clans in the series are Humans, Giants, Fairies, Goddesses, and Demons, all of which possess powerful abilities and magical powers. In naming the characters, the manga offers a wide variety of further mythical, historical, geographical, and cultural allusions, e.g., King Arthur, Merlin, Gowther, Zaratras (Zoroaster), Dreyfus, Gustaf, Frisia, Jericho, Galand, Derierrie, Albions, The Vampires, and Zhivago.

Main The Seven Deadly Sins characters

Seven Deadly Sins
The  were the strongest and cruelest order of Holy Knights in the kingdom, formed by Meliodas and six other brutal criminals from various races who were branded symbols of beasts to symbolize the sin that motivated their crimes. Each of the members of the group had the highest Holy Knight ranking, Diamond. They were branded as traitors to Britannia, having allegedly abetted the assassination of the Great Holy Knight Zaratras. The Deadly Sins are eventually absolved of their crimes after liberating Liones from rule of the Holy Knights.

Meliodas

Meliodas is the captain of the Seven Deadly Sins, who bears the Sin of Wrath as a Dragon symbol on his left shoulder. Despite being called the Sin of Wrath, displaying it whenever those dear to him are endangered or killed, Meliodas conceals his rage under the façade of a mellow trickster who is often seen fondling Elizabeth one way or another. When found by Elizabeth at the start of the series, who seeks his help in reuniting the Deadly Sins after their disbandment ten years prior, Meliodas reveals to be doing the same thing. Despite his adolescent appearance, Meliodas is actually a demon who is over three thousand years old. Meliodas is later revealed to be the son of the Demon King and original leader of the Ten Commandments, possessing the fragment of his father's soul embodying Love. But Meliodas turned his back on his people when he fell in love with the Goddess Elizabeth, killing two of his fellow Commandments and causing the Holy War to occur. The Demon King allowed the Supreme Deity of the Goddess race to curse Meliodas with immortality, with the Demon King cursing Elizabeth with perpetual death and reincarnation to make his son suffer every time he is reunited with her. Due to the curse's nature, Meliodas' soul ends up in Purgatory with the Demon King feasting on his emotions before reviving him, gradually reverting to his former self as a result. Meliodas soon discovers his feelings for Elizabeth and ends up marrying her having one child named Tristan. Meliodas has two brothers, however both of his brothers fought for evil ending up siding with the demon king aka their father. Meliodas has to fight his brothers in order to surpass his father.
After Elizabeth begins regaining her memories as the goddess Elizabeth which would mean that she will die in three days of gaining her memories, Meliodas resolves to become the new demon king to break their curses. He disbands the Deadly Sins and enters an alliance with Zeldris after promising to use his status to release his brother's love Gelda, revealing to have absorbed the Commandment of Pacifism and intending to absorb the other commandments. Despite becoming a vessel for the Demon King before managing to force him out of his body, Meliodas freed him and Elizabeth from their curses though he would leave the living world because his power as a Demon king. But the victory is short-lived as the Demon King possesses Zeldris and restores Elizabeth's curse, prompting the Sins' final battle with the Demon King. After killing his father, Meliodas sacrifices his Demon king powers to completely destroy the commandments to prevent the Demon King from reviving. In the series epilogue, Meliodas married Elizabeth and become the rulers of Liones with Tristan as their son. 
As Seven Deadly Sins' captain once revered by his kin as the most powerful demon, Meliodas is immensely powerful and agile. His signature ability is called , which reflects magical attacks back at the attacker with far greater power, the only drawbacks being that he can only use it as a counter and that it is ineffective against physical attacks. Meliodas can also tap into his demonic power, manifesting versatile dark energy from his body to increase his offense and defense at the cost of entering a berserker state. Meliodas initially carried a sword hilt called the Dragon Handle before it was stolen by Helbram and later revealed to be a fragment of the Coffin of Eternal Darkness, which was used to seal away the Demon clan. He later regains his Sacred Treasure , a curved short-sword that allows him to create up to four weaker clones of himself that compensate for their lack in power by using Full Counter to its full potential.

Diane

Diane, standing thirty-feet tall, is a 750 year-old member of the Giants' Clan from the land of Megadoza, who bears the Sin of Envy, symbolized by a Serpent symbol tattooed on her left thigh. Unlike her more violent kinsmen who make a living as mercenaries, Diane dislikes fighting. Having run away from home, she came upon King by chance, and the two spent centuries together before he erased her memories of him, and she returned to her tribe soon after. She later became an apprentice of her chieftain Matrona, alongside Dolores, and accompanied Matrona when she was hired by a Holy Knight unit under the command of Gannon, who actually intended to kill the giants and make a name for himself. It ended with Matrona seemingly dying from being poisoned and slaughtering the knights with Diane ending up in Liones' custody and falsely accused of both the knights' slaughter and murdering Matrona in an act of envy. She was recruited by Meliodas before her execution could be carried out. Following the Deadly Sins' disbandment, Diane hid in the Forest of White Dreams before Meliodas and Elizabeth recruited her. Diane having feelings for the former for treating her like an equal and being initially jealous whenever he flirts with Elizabeth. But after being impressed with Elizabeth's selflessness before regaining her memories of her time with King, Diane becomes very good friends with Elizabeth. She eventually regains her childhood memories of King and forms a relationship with him, eventually getting married after the Deadly Sins disband despite the ceremony being disrupted by the Supreme Being's attempt to bring about a new Holy War.
As a Giant, Diane is incredibly strong with a deep connection to nature which allows her to manipulate the earth with her race's ability . Diane retains her strength and agility even when human-sized while participating in a fighting festival under Matrona's name, quickly defeating ten men and hardening her skin, thereby making it as hard as iron to enhance her durability and strength. Her sacred treasure is Gideon, a 2200 pound war-hammer that enhances Diane's earth manipulation powers to a point where a single swing can lift a mountain into the air.

Ban

Ban, is a member of the Deadly Sins and bears the Sin of Greed, symbolized by a Fox symbol tattooed above the left side of his waist. Despite being a good-natured person, he is the Sins' most immortal member and infamous as a legendary bandit. At times, the team thinks of him as annoying and very immature. He had taken to a life of thievery at a young age under the tutelage of Zhivago (for example he stole clothes). Years later, Ban learned of the Fountain of Youth and attempted to become immortal so he would live long enough for "something good to happen to him". However, Ban changed his mind when the fountain's guardian Elaine revealed the forest would die if he drank the liquid. He fell in love with the fairy over seven days. She was grateful for him, as her brother had left her alone for seven hundred years prior to meeting Ban. A red demon appeared soon after and in an attempt to kill it, Ban and Elaine were fatally wounded. However, Elaine saved Ban by giving him the liquid from the fountain through a kiss. As she was dying, she gave him an Almoca Seed, which he uses to create a new Sacred Tree. Ban was falsely accused by the Liones Kingdom of destroying and stealing from the previous fountain; he was later recruited by Meliodas after surviving numerous executions. Following the Deadly Sins' disbandment, Ban allowed himself to be captured and held captive within Baste Dungeon, which he escaped occasionally so he could tend to the Sacred Tree. He was later nicknamed “King Ban” by the fairy race for his actions. He eventually rejoins the Deadly Sins and serves as a cook in the Boar Hat, whilst getting into occasional confrontations with Meliodas and King. During the New Holy War, after returning from Purgatory with Meliodas' emotions, Ban uses his experience there to transfer his immortality into Elaine to save her life.  In the series epilogue, Ban married Elaine and they have a son named Lancelot. 
While immortal, unaffected by fatigue or need of sustenance, Ban can heal his body regardless of any severe wound with his blood have healing properties. While Ban sacrificed his immortality, his body became highly durable from his myriad of years in Purgatory's unforgiving environment. Ban also shows some skill with weaponry in the present, particularly with a three-section staff very similar in appearance to a nunchaku. His sacred treasure Courechouse is a four-sectioned staff that was ironically stolen from him during the Deadly Sins' disbandment, the culprit revealed to be Merlin when she returned it to him during the final battle with the Demon King.

King

The fairy King, his real name being , is the 1300-year-old member of the Fairy Race who bears the Sin of Sloth, symbolized by Grizzly bear symbol tattooed just above his left ankle. He is portrayed as the group's 'straight man' while often getting caught up in the others' shenanigans. Originally the third king of the Fairy King's Forest, King forsook his duties when he left his domain to rescue his friend Helbram from human abductors and he was saved by Diane after being inflicted with amnesia-inducing injuries. Centuries after regaining his memories and realizing his amnesia was caused by a maddened Helbram, King is forced to kill his friend to cease his human killing spree. He then erased Diane's memories of him before being sentenced by Liones to a 1000-year imprisonment for failing to stop Helbram in time and abandoning his duties as king, with the Fairy King's Forest eventually being destroyed by a demon that would kill his sister Elaine. After joining the Seven Deadly Sins, King would occasionally disguise himself as a slovenly over-weighted man to keep Diane from remembering him. Following the Deadly Sins' disbandment, King finally learned of his homeland's destruction while believing Ban was responsible. He crosses paths with the Sins when they heard he took refuge in the Necropolis, reluctantly rejoining the group once learning the truth behind his sister's death. Despite Diane's affection towards Meliodas, King remains devoted to her as she eventually regains her memories of their time together.
Like members of the fairy race, King has the ability to levitate and float through the air, as well as being able to levitate certain objects and manipulate their trajectory without the need of making physical contact. King also possesses a sacred treasure called . A spear crafted from a sacred tree only found in the Fairy Realm, it is much stronger than steel and possesses the mysterious qualities of the tree, which King's ability, draws out. At will, King can instantly change Chastiefol into one of several different forms, including a pillow which can act as a shield, different forms of spears (one of which can turn an enemy to stone), a massive flower sprouted from the earth that projects an enormous energy beam, and even a large stuffed grizzly bear. But despite his impressive magical abilities and able to move at speeds while in midair, King is physically weak and unable to hold his own in a fight while unarmed.
King was voted the most popular character by a large margin in a Weekly Shōnen Magazine character poll for the series, with close to four times as many votes as Ban, who came in second place.

Gowther

Gowther is a member of the Deadly Sins who bears the Sin of Lust, symbolized by the Goat symbol tattooed above his breast; he is an androgynous and bespectacled bookworm with pink hair who originally clad himself in a massive suit of armor Merlin designed to stabilize his power due to his unstable mind. He is first seen as emotionless and analytically stoic while also very socially inept as his curiosity often has him performing highly questionable actions, such as manipulating the memories of others. At the time he was discovered, being a skilled actor when he feels like it, he was living under the alias Armand ("Alan" in the anime) and traveling with a Holy Knight named Dale whom he clad in his armor on to contain the knight's transformation into a demon.
Gowther is later revealed to be an animated doll created by his namesake, a demon sorcerer forced to bear the Demon King's soul fragment bearing , which causes those inflicted by it to lose their sense of self. While modeled after his creator's lover Glariza to serve as his proxy in the Ten Commandments. Gowther received free will before helping his creator end the Holy War by rewriting Mael's identity. Gowther disappeared afterward, found centuries later in the cellar of Liones Castle by Bartra's sister Princess Nadja, whom Gowther fell in love with. While Nadja returned the sentiment, she died from an illness of the heart while resting against Gowther. In the manga, this was a result of the couple engaging in romantic relations together, after which Nadja expired. Gowther tried reviving her with his magic heart, a charm that he was told gives him his emotions, but it failed to resurrect her while making it appear that he had sadistically raped then murdered her. Gowther accepted the blame for his "crime of lust" out of guilt, discarding his magic heart to render himself emotionless to no longer feel the pain of losing Nadja. It was only after learning that King and Diane were searching for his magic heart that Gowther learned that it was only a placebo to begin with and begins accepting his emotions, allowing him to be more sociable while using his power to its full extent without trouble.
Gowther's special ability, Invasion, is a versatile ability that enables him to invade a person's mind and manipulate it in various ways that include memory alteration, forcing opponents to relive their worse moments, and telepathically relaying coordinated battle plans to his allies almost instantaneously. As a doll, Gowther has shown a high level of resilience to attacks normally fatal to humans like decapitation. His sacred treasure is Herritt, which takes the form of twin bows made of light which greatly enhances the spread and range of his Invasion. Like Hawk, Gowther is equipped with a Balor Power Eye that allows him to detect the overall power level of anyone in his vicinity.

Merlin

Merlin is a cool and calculative member of the Deadly Sins who bears the Sin of Gluttony, symbolized by the Boar symbol tattooed above her neck, normally in the form of an attractive raven-haired woman in skimpy clothing, Merlin is a 3000-year-old witch known as the Daughter of Belialuin as her true name is unpronounceable by humans. Trained by her father the chief sage and the demon wizard Gowther, Merlin possessed vast magical potential and was raised as a weapon for her peoples' use against the higher ranking goddesses and demons. She fled Belialuin and crossed paths with Meliodas, with whom she fell in love, motivating her to assume an adult form and use a combination of the Infinity and  spells to render herself an ageless immortal. She bore no animosity towards Meliodas and Elizabeth when they fell in love with each other, treating the latter like a sister. Merlin lives up to her sin with her obsession of filling the void in her heart when she learned of Chaos and resolves to release the entity from its seal, causing Belialuin's destruction when exploited the recruitment attempts of the Demon King and the Supreme Deity to increase her power with added immunity to their factions' powers. 
After enlisting the giant Dabuzu to create the Coffin of Eternal Darkness in order to seal away the Demons and the Supreme Deity, Merlin wandered Brittania before reuniting with Meliodas and helping him establish the Seven Deadly Sins as a means to eliminate either the Demon King or the Supreme Deity to cause the imbalance needed for her agenda. When the Sins were accused of killing Zaratras, Merlin knocked Meliodas out to extract most of his power as a precautionary measure due to the wrath and destruction Meliodas released upon the death of one of Elizabeth's reincarnations. Before returning to the Sins, Merlin positioned herself as mentor to a young Arthur Pendragon. While on somewhat friendly terms with the other Deadly Sins, Merlin seemed to particularly enjoy Escanor's unrequited feelings for her. Following the death of the Demon King, having influenced events of the group's final battles by reactivating Elizabeth's reincarnation curse, Merlin reveals her true reasons for aiding the Sins when she conducts a ritual to resurrect Arthur as a vessel of Chaos. The other Sins felt betrayed after learning Merlin's story from the Lady of the Lake, but eventually forgive her with Melodias telling her to take responsibility for whatever results from her actions. Merlin remains by Arthur's side during the Four Knights of the Apocalypse, allowing him to act on his whims even when being asked for advice.

Merlin has mastery over a vast repertoire of spells with flight, illusions, and telekinesis among them. She can maintain any spell indefinitely regardless of its mana cost through her ability Infinity. Through the Demon King's and Supreme Deity's boons, with immunity to being manipulated by goddesses and any form of curse, Merlin acquires spells exclusive to the Demon and Goddess races like Perfect Cube, a Demon spell which encases and traps a small area in a cube-like barrier that is impervious to virtually any attack.

Escanor

Escanor, a member of the Deadly who bears the Sin of Pride, epitomized by the Lion symbol tattooed on his back, the middle-aged Escanor was originally a prince of the Kingdom of Castellio until he was disowned and driven from his homeland due to his inability to control his monstrous strength, with a woman named Rosa helping him escape via the sea in a barrel. He had been traveling alone ever since, helping wherever he goes but driven off by fearful townsfolk. He later ended up joining the Seven Deadly Sins as their final member when he ended up in Liones, making him feel welcome as he fell in love with Merlin and later played a role in devastating Edinburgh Castle during the Deadly Sins' battle with the vampires. Following the group's disbandment, Escanor opened a secret tavern in the mountains where he remained until Ban found him by accident. Escanor rejoins the Deadly Sins soon after and, as a result of being gradually unable to withstand his own power, dies in the aftermath of the group's final battle against the Demon King.
For reasons unknown, Escanor acquired Archangel Mael's Grace , which increases his physical strength depending on the position of the sun at the cost of making him overconfident. Escanor reaches his full power for one minute of noon when the sun is at its zenith, exceeding every living being on the planet as power incarnate known as "The One". Escanor can also use this ability to emit sunlight from his body so as to destroy nearly everything in close proximity. But like the other Graces, it gradually damages Escanor's body before continued use becomes harmful to him. Escanor's sacred treasure is Rhitta, a massive ornate one-handed axe with a crescent blade named after "the maiden loved by the sun". At night, he cannot even lift the weapon off the ground, but he can easily grasp with a single hand the moment it becomes dawn. He can summon Rhitta to his side at a moment's notice and is able to store sunlight within it for later use.

Elizabeth Liones

Elizabeth Liones is originally from the Kingdom of Danafor before it was destroyed. She was adopted from Meliodas to Bartra Liones as the third princess of Liones. She becomes an ally of the Seven Deadly Sins when seeking their help after the Great Holy Knights seized control of the kingdom, serving as a waitress in Meliodas' bar. Despite being frail and not a fighter, Elizabeth is very courageous and willing to protect others at the cost of her own health, like allowing Hendrickson to acquire her blood to free the Demon Race from the Coffin of Eternal Darkness. Still, being only a teenager, she is fairly gullible and easily influenced, often tricked by Meliodas' jokes. She doesn't seem to mind how often he caresses, molests, or harasses her sexually, however, and has even fallen in love with him due to a sense of familiarity with and nostalgia for him.
Queen Elizabeth is later revealed to be the 107th reincarnation of the Goddess Elizabeth, known as Ella (Bloody Ellie in the English Dub of the anime) for her rarely seen violent streak before meeting Meliodas with their love causing the Holy War between their races. Elizabeth was killed near the war's end when she and Meliodas are attacked by their parents for their love, Elizabeth cursed by the Demon King to endlessly reincarnate as a human. The curse serves to torment Meliodas as Elizabeth would die within three days of regaining her powers and memories. In her current life, Elizabeth's latent power manifested in her ability to heal living things with tears from her right eye, manifesting more of her power in times of stress. Elizabeth eventually regains full memory of her previous incarnations and her full Goddess power is unleashed, activating her curse as the New Holy War is about to commence. This forces Meliodas to take a gambit of acquiring his father's power to break Elizabeth's curse, with Merlin briefly restoring the curse in secret as a means to force Meliodas to kill his father. Following the Sins disbanding, Elizabeth succeeds her father as queen of Liones with Meliodas as her husband.

Hawk

Hawk is a talking Gloucestershire old spots pig and Meliodas's pet/companion, introduced as the Boar Hat's 'captain of the Order of Scraps Disposal' as he eats disgusting table scraps. Hawk found Meliodas in a ditch sixteen years prior, and the two established a mobile bar together, having been together ever since. They often engage in harmless banter, with Hawk frequently seen scolding Meliodas for his perverted actions towards Elizabeth. Though mostly serving as comic relief by acting overly arrogant, he yet aids Elizabeth and the Sins several times, utilizing headbutts and other modest attacks on weaker enemies and transporting wounded allies. In the Kingdom Infiltration Arc, Hawk sacrifices himself to block a fatal attack of Hendrickson's aimed at Meliodas, and his death caused much anguish for Elizabeth and the Sins. But Hawk mysteriously revives from his remains as a piglet before regaining his normal size through excessive eating. Besides Meliodas, Hawk gets particularly well along with Ban and Merlin. Later, the latter equips him with a Balor Power Eye that allows him to detect the power level of anyone he sees. During his training in Istal, Hawk learns that he temporarily acquires the traits of whatever magical creature he eats, obtaining their powers until he digests them. It is later revealed that Hawk is a denizen of Purgatory and the younger brother of Wild, the latest of the creatures that the Demon King used as a means of spying on Meliodas from Purgatory.

Main Four Knights of the Apocalypse characters

Four Knights of the Apocalypse
The  are an order of Holy Knights that serve as the protagonists of the sequel series. Each described to possess unique powers, the Four Knights are prophesied by King Arthur Pendragon to bring destruction to the world.

Percival

Percival is the Knight of Death. Besides his rare ability Hope, tapping into his comrades' faith in him to increase his abilities, Percival also uses Meliodas's Dragon Handle after Howzer reforges it into a functional sword.

Lancelot

The Knight of War and half-fairy son of Ban and Elaine, possessing his mother's ability to hear the hearts of others along with the ability to transform himself from human to fairy form. He later become affiliated with Liones and tasked by Melodias to find those prophesied to become the Four Knights of the Apocalypse, assuming the identity of a talking fox named  to act without being discovered by Camelot's forces. He guides Percival to Liones to help him hone his strength before revealing his true identity.

Tristan

The Knight of Pestilence and prince of Liones due to being the son of Meliodas and Elizabeth, protagonist of the two part film  The Seven Deadly Sins: Grudge of Edinburgh. He is a Nephilim, inheriting the evil and holy powers of his parents' clans. Meeting his father's comrades on his tenth birthday, Tristan learns of the Sins' exploits and resolves to become a Holy Knight like them. As prince of Liones, he leads his personal Holy Knight order known as the Tristan Platoon.

Gawain

The Knight of Famine and Arthur Pendragon's niece, and the only female member of the Four Knights. She shares Mael's Sunshine abilities and carries the Divine Sword Litta, a sword with the same name and functions as Escanor's divine axe. Gawain has a superiority complex due to her grandparents' upbringing and believes that she is the strongest of the Four, mentally regressing into a temperamental child whenever her confidence is broken.

Percival Platoon
The  consists of Perceval's traveling companions during his journey to Liones, appointed as Holy Knights by Meliodas after Arthur's attack on the kingdom.

Donny is a cowardly failed Holy Knight trainee, later revealed to be Howser's nephew, who joins Percival by accident while traveling as part of a circus troupe. He has the power of telekinesis, which he initially mistakes as an ability that simply makes objects float in place, and is a highly skilled knife wielder. Following attack by King Arthur on Liones, he is appointed Holy Knight by Meliodas.

Nasiens is a herbalist from Echo Gorge who works in creating drugs and poisons, befriending Percival and affectionately viewing him as his guinea pig. His magic is "Mix Venom", which allows him to safely consume any poison and create his own with various properties, sometimes enchanting his dagger "Henbane" and shortsword "Belladonna" with them. Following attack by King Arthur on Liones, he is appointed Holy Knight by Meliodas.

Anghalhad, nicknamed , is a governor's daughter from the town of Sistana, and an aspiring Holy Knight and fencer. She has the gift to sense when others are lying or have hidden intentions, making her distrustful of others, but learns to overcome her skepticism when she meets Percival, who lacks any sense of deceit. Following attack by King Arthur on Liones, she is appointed Holy Knight by Meliodas.

Tristan Platoon
The  is an order of Holy Knights led by Tristan.

Chion is Gilthunder and Margaret's son who is devoted to Prince Tristan, but treats the other Knights of the Apocalypse with suspicion as he always has the worst-case scenario in mind. He has the power to summon elemental spirits.

Isolde is an over-six-foot-tall female knight her ability is called Love Bomb which can create explosions born from her love for Tristan. She is temperamental and feels affection towards Tristan, but is insecure due to her height.

Jade is Chion's childhood friend who can create orbs of darkness around his opponents' heads to block their vision.

Liones Kingdom
The Liones Kingdom is the setting for most of the story with its  being among the most powerful knight orders in Britannia. Sometime before the beginning of the series, via the machinations of the demon Fraudrin, Hendrickson orchestrates a coup d'état and takes control of Liones. This caused the kingdom to fall into a state of distress as citizens from towns and villages surrounding the kingdom were enslaved or forcefully recruited into joining the Holy Knights in preparation for a Holy War. Under the rule of the Holy Knights, death was the penalty for insubordination. Following Hendrickson's defeat and Dreyfus's disappearance, Baltra pardoned most of the knights as he preferred they atone for their actions.

Liones Royal Family

Bartra Liones is the King of Liones and Elizabeth's adoptive father, who is held captive by the Holy Knights after their coup d'état. He possesses a power known as Vision, which bestows him foresight which gave him some knowledge of a second Holy War. After Hendrickson's defeat, he forgives the Holy Knights since he knows they were being manipulated and that their strength would be needed in the upcoming New Holy War. Following the war's conclusion, Baltra steps down as king with Meliodas becoming his successor through the latter's marriage to Elizabeth. His name is romanized "Baltra" in the first fanbook, but this is changed to "Bartra" in the second fanbook and volume 22.

Margaret is the First Princess of Liones and Elizabeth's eldest adoptive sister. Ten years prior to the beginning of the story, she witnessed the murder of Zaratras at the hands of Hendrickson and Dreyfus and told Gilthunder about it. Unfortunately, Hendrickson found out and she allowed herself to be imprisoned by the Holy Knights, who used her as a means to force Gilthunder into obeying Hendrickson. She is later possessed by Archangel Ludoshel due to her latent magical abilities for the New Holy War before Hendrickson managed to expel the Archangel from Margaret's body. After the war ended, Margaret and Gilthunder started a relationship while simultaneously refusing her father's initial offer of them becoming his successors. 

Veronica, is the Second Princess of Liones and Elizabeth's elder adoptive sister. She is described as a tomboy. As a child, she used to play swords with boys, which her father scolded her for. Despite sharing the Holy Knights' views on enslaving citizens, she deeply cares about Elizabeth. She sacrifices herself to protect Elizabeth, but recovered thanks to Elizabeth's power. It's shown that Veronica has feelings for her bodyguard and friend Griamore but was initially unsure about how to proceed with these feelings, however after Griamore was turned into a young boy, Veronica gave him a kiss and he returned back to his regular self. They were trying to keep their relationship a secret but their families already knew.

Holy Knights

Zaratras was the former Grand Master of the Holy Knights and the strongest of his order, who was assassinated ten years ago by the demon Fraudrin when he possessed Zaratras' half-brother Dreyfus and enlisted Hendrickson's assistance, with the Seven Deadly Sins framed for the murder. Gilthunder's father and Griamore's uncle, he is a Druid and possess the power of Purge which can destroy any evil soul. 
Zaratras is temporarily revived after the Ten Commandments take over Britannia, furious with himself for not realizing that Dreyfus and Hendrickson were being manipulated. Despite his power and rank, he's rather quirky. He stumbles upon the Boar Hat and shows Elizabeth and Hawk memories of how he and King Baltras first met Meliodas. Zaratras uses his remaining power to exorcise Fraudrin from Dreyfus' body, telling his brother and Hendrickson to stop blaming themselves for his death as he returns to the afterlife.

Gilthunder is a Holy Knight, Griamore's cousin, and Dreyfus's nephew who is the son of Zaratras'; he has the ability to use magic to generate and manipulate lightning. When Gilthunder was younger, he looked up to the Seven Deadly Sins and wanted to be just like them as he was trained by Meliodas. When Gilthunder learned of his father's murder by his uncle and Hendrickson, he was forced to follow the latter when Vivian uses her familiars on him and Margret to force him into compliance. He has since become emotionless while pursuing the Sins, cryptically hinting to Meliodas that he needs his help. Once Meliodas destroys the familiar following Margret, Gilthunder joins the Sins in fighting Hendrickson. After Hendrickson's defeat, he, Howzer, and Griamore investigate the Demon clan's return to Britannia and later join forces with the Seven Deadly Sins to fight the Ten Commandments. He ended in a relationship with Margaret Liones in at least the dating stage at the end of the series. 

A Holy Knight whom the Sins first encounter at the Necropolis when she placed herself in a state of near-death to pursue them with her spirit, she is dedicated knight whose power of Explosion allows her to create powerful explosions. Guila joined the Holy Knights to be someone her little brother Zeal could be proud of after their father Dale mysteriously abandoned his post. Guila later learns that her father was subject to Hendrickson's experiments with demon blood, with herself being one of his New-Generation Holy Knights; she sides with the Sins after Diane risks her well-being to save Zeal from Helbram's attack.
 In Four Knights of the Apocalypse, Guila has the position of Vice Great Holy Knight of Liones. Being the only new-generation Holy Knight to retain her demonic power, Guila mastered her ability and is able to assume a demon-like form.

 Initially an apprentice Holy Knight under the Weird Fangs, Jericho is a skilled swordswoman who initially dressed herself up as a young man due to her low self esteem in an attempt at being taken serious by her male peers. But after being humiliated by Ban and accepting Hendrickson's proposal of becoming a New Generation Holy Knight, Jericho embraces her femininity while resolute to make Ban suffer. But Jericho begins to develop feelings for Ban after he saves her from being consumed by the demon blood in her body and has been following him ever since; unwelcome in the new Fairy King's Forest, she later witnesses Ban's reunion with his father, Zhivago. When a revived Elaine attempts to kill her, she snaps the fairy of her jealous rage by expressing her love for Ban as unrequited. Jericho then refuses to abandon Ban and Elaine after they are trounced in battle by two of the Ten Commandments, carrying them off in an attempt to save them before stumbling upon Escanor's bar.
After the death of her brother, Gustaf, Jericho discovers that she possesses ice magic, just like he did, and decides to carry out her brother's will. After the war, she stayed a Holy Knight serving in Liones. After the first major time skip of a year and a half, while training with Howzer and Guila, she ran off to the Fairy King's Forest after a fairy informs her of Lancelot's birth.
 In Four Knights of the Apocalypse, having fallen in love with her apprentice Lancelot despite their familial ties and age disparity, Jericho defected to Camelot after Arthur promised to grant her desire of a world where Lancelot loves her. 

A Holy Knight with the rank of Platinum and dominion over magic that allows him to generate and manipulate wind, he is also a childhood friend of Gilthunder's. Despite being hot-blooded and self-confident, he also believes in the honor of the Holy Knights and looks up to Dreyfus. He fights at the Vaizel annual fighting festival and is defeated by Diane. After realizing the identity of the Seven Deadly Sins and witnessing Diane saving an innocent civilian, he begins to wonder whether they are really as bad everyone says they are. After witnessing many cruelties on the part of his fellow Knights and seeing Diane protecting Guila's brother, he sides with the Sins and protects Diane from Dreyfus, despite being grossly outmatched. Later, it is hinted that he harbours romantic feelings towards Diane. After Fraudrin's defeat, he is surprisingly named Great Holy Knight by King Baltra in Gilthunder's absence. Despite his initial doubts, he accepts.
 During the events of Four Knights of the Apocalypse, Howzer encounters his nephew Donny and Percival's group and reluctantly entrusts the Dragon Handle to Percival after forging it into a true sword.

The current Great Holy Knight alongside his best friend Hendrickson, he is also Zaratras' younger brother, Griamore's father, and Gilthunder's uncle. He is a dignified and diligent person who is very dedicated to his duties. It is revealed that Dreyfus was possessed by the demon Fraudin, who assumed his identity while he and Hendrickson murdered Zaratras and framed the Sins. Dreyfus is eventually freed from Fraudin and seeks atonement for his role in the crisis that befell Britannia, inheriting some of Fraudin's power and knowledge of the Goddess Race. He later retires after the Holy War's conclusion and becomes a sword fighting instructor.
He possesses the power Break, an embodiment of his will, which is capable of shattering the opponent's techniques and has great destructive potential.

 A Grand Master Holy Knight and good friend of Dreyfus', he also was his accomplice in the murder of Zaratras. He possesses the power Acid, which deteriorates the opponent's body upon being struck with a weapon infused with it, unless he is defeated or it dispelled by strong magic. Hendrickson also has knowledge of forbidden Druid techniques, such as Enslavement of the Dead, which can reanimates a corpse twice with their abilities reduced and the reanimation turning them into a mindless puppet. 
Later revealed to having been manipulated by the demon Fraudrin, Hendrickson became dishonourable and manipulative since he murdered Zaratras as he resolves to cause a new Holy War by releasing the Demons race so the Holy Knights would once again have meaning and purpose. Hendrickson later acquired the corpses of Helbram and a demon that destroyed the Fairy King's Forest, learning that the latter's blood can enhance humans, a technique perfected in the New Generation of Holy Knights, whose demon blood he can activate at will with his Blood Awaken ability — which he does during the Sins' assault on the capital, turning the New-Generation knights into monsters that work havoc until the Sins manage to rid them of the demons possessing their bodies.
Hendrickson drinks a vial of demon blood after Gilthunder mortally injures him, reattaching his severed arm as he becomes a youthful version of himself with some of Meliodas' powers as he kidnaps Elizabeth to complete his plan and seemingly kills Dreyfus. After being cornered by the Sins, Hendrickson reveals to also possess the body of a Gray Demon as he uses its blood to become a true demon before being defeated by Meliodas. Hendrickson survived and was healed by Fraudrin using Dreyfus' body, restored to his original self and spared by the demon while witnessing the Demon Race's return to Britannia. A repentant Hendrickson later comes to aid Gilthunder, Howzer, and Griamore in defeating a Gray Demon, aiding the Seven Deadly Sins in their mission to face the Ten Commandments despite King still resenting him for using Helbram.

A Holy Knight and Dreyfus's son who was assigned Veronica's bodyguard at a young age, He possesses the ability to create spherical barriers that are effective against most attacks. Griamore is very devoted to Veronica to the point of opposing the Holy Knights of Henderickson's faction when they threatened to harm her if he refuse to hand Elizabeth over to them. After taking a seemingly dead Veronica to Pernes for a proper burial at Elizabeth's request, Griamore was reported dead before returning at the last minute to aid in Hendrickson's defeat. He accompanies his cousin Gilthunder and Howzer in their search for answers regarding his father's research, only to gain Hendrickson as an ally when they face a Gray Demon.
Griamore is later cursed to revert into his childhood self by the ability of a monster that he and Slader fight during their training in Istal, ultimately playing a role in Fraudin's defeat as the demon grew to care about him. Griamore eventually returned to his true self when Veronica, whom he is in love with, broke the spell by kissing him. It's later revealed that they were trying terribly to hide their relationship from everyone. 

A Cardinal-ranked Holy Knight and Hendrickson's second-in-command, Helbram is ruthlessly cruel and sadistic with the ability to disguise himself as an imp named Love Helm. He also uses a skill called Link that allows him to use the powers of those who willingly give him their power, which also allowed him to transfer damage dealt to him to them to evade fatal attacks at the cost of some of their lives. Helbram is eventually revealed to be a member of the Fairy race and an old friend of King's; he was originally interested in humans until he and his fellow fairies were kidnapped by a human named Aldrich, who wanted to sell their wings. Helbram was traumatized by watching his friends die, losing his sanity thinking Aldrich had killed King, and wound up killing Aldrich as a result, assuming his form to maintain his immense misanthropy as he went on a murderous rampage, killing humans — determined to kill them all —, until King reunited with him 500 years later and killed Helbram, honouring an old promise to stop his former best friend in the event that such a fate should befall him. But fairies' corpses never decompose, and Helbram's body ended up in Henderickson's possession and was reanimated by a curse, each revival further eroding Helbram's mind. 
After King kills him again, it is revealed that the helmet of his Love Helm guise was meant as a gift for him; Helbram is reanimated a second time as a semi-mindless shell, retaining enough of his consciousness to force King to completely destroy his body with his spirit bound to the helmet which King takes. The helmet is eventually destroyed when Helbram offers it to Diane while she was possessed by the spirits of a village he destroyed ages ago, allowing him to pass on. King salvages the helmet's remains to use them as a decoration in his new outfit.

An enigmatic Holy Knight who served under Hendrickson and was previously Merlin's apprentice, regarded as Liones' greatest mage. She expresses a disdain for Merlin, as well as pigs, shown when she teleports Hawk away upon coming across him. Vivian is also obsessed with Gilthunder, subjecting him and Margaret to her familiars to keep them apart and under Hendrickson's control. Following Hendrickson's defeat, Vivian is exiled from Liones and outfitted by Merlin with a cursed non-detachable ring that would kill her if she were to try and use her magic on Gilthunder. Merlin also gave Gilthunder a secret word that would allow Vivian to become completely subservient to him. Vivian later assumed the guise of a male mage named Gilfrost to infiltrate Liones as an ally until the Ten Commandants conquer the city, when she spirits Gilthunder away to a tower high above the skies so she could keep him forever. However, she is mortally wounded by Ludoshel after Margaret allowed the archangel to possess her so she could save Gilthunder. But Vivian is saved from death by Henderickson at the behest of Dreyfus, whom she turned her affections towards following her recovery and being freed of Merlin's curse.

Jericho's older brother, who used to work for Helbram and is able to use magic that allows him to control ice. He and Jericho had not been in good terms since the time he told her she could never become a knight like him, but the reason for this turns out to be his concern about her. When Jericho turns into a Demon, Gustaf begs Ban to save his sister. He later participates in defending Liones from the Ten Commandments; fatally stabbed by one of the Holy Knights under Zeldris' control, he uses his remaining strength to prevent his sister and Zeal from being turned into demons by Grayroad.

Head of the Guard of Liones West Gate, he holds the title of Ruby Holy Knight. His magic Perverseness makes anyone whom his damages do the opposite of their intended actions.

Weird Fangs
Following the destruction of Baste Prison, the surviving Weird Fangs leave Liones before later returning, only to learn of the chaos that occurred in their absence.

A Holy Knight with the ability to manipulate insects, uncaring towards whom she hurts in the process as long as she kills the enemy. Freesia teams up with Ruin to defeat the Seven Deadly Sins, but when Ruin's plan fails, Freesia is defeated by Diane. After a long absence, she and Ruin are revealed to have gone into hiding, only to be found by inhabitants of a village who serve the Demons and procure souls for them in exchange for their lives being spared. After witnessing Fraudrin consume Ruin's soul, she's pinned down by the villagers, with her soul eaten as well.

A Holy Knight with the ability to turn himself invisible, Golgius tends to be a coward that uses underhand tricks to win his fights or to escape. He forces Dr. Dana to poison Meliodas while he is healing him. Golgius is later defeated by Meliodas and runs away. After returning to Liones to find the kingdom's countryside overrun with demons, an injured Golgius escapes and stumbles upon the Boar Hat. After being nursed back to health, Hawk recognizes his scent, but Elizabeth admits that she holds no grudge towards him and lets him off.

 Ruin is the Leader of Weird Fangs, who possesses illusionary and hypnotic abilities, the source of which is a little bell mounted at the top of his staff, as well as the ability to harden his body. Of all the Weird Fangs, Ruin is shown to be the cruellest as he beats an unarmed Elizabeth and appears to enjoy it. Apparently killed, Ruin and Freesia go into hiding, only for Fraudrin to later consume his soul before he is able to react.

A Holy Knight and one of the four Weird Fangs of Baste Dungeon who aided in the capture of the Deadly Sin, Ban. He tortured Ban mercilessly while keeping him imprisoned. Jude is believed to have been killed by Ban when he escaped.

Roars of Dawn
 are a group of independent Holy Knights known for their tenacity to see their missions through to the very end. They first encounter the Deadly Sins while tasked with decapitating the Armoured Giant and bringing his head to Helbram, with Gowther ending the conflict peacefully. The group later dwindles to two members after the other three are killed by Fraudin while escorting Dreyfus to prison.

The Roars of Dawn's leader, a tall, long-haired, and effeminate man who wears an iron mask and wields a saw-toothed sword. Slader is fully loyal to Baltra, who rescued him from savages as a youth, while also expressing an admiration towards Merlin. His ability is "Overpower", which allows him to momentarily freeze an enemy in place through sheer intimidation. He later accompanies the Seven Deadly Sins in their mission against the Ten Commandments as the caretaker of an unstable Gowther.

Seemingly the youngest member of the Roars of Dawn, Simon is a young long-haired boy who wields a long katana-like blade and wears a samuraiesque armor.

Weinheidt is the Roars of Dawn's archer, able to engulf his arrows in energy and create an illusionary double of himself as a decoy. He was killed by a possessed Dreyfus, alongside Jillian and Hugo.

Jillian is the only female member of the Roars of Dawn; she wields a sword and can ensnare her enemies with magical binding. She is killed by a possessed Dreyfus, alongside Weinheidt and Hugo.

The largest member of the Roars of Dawn, Hugo is covered from head to toe in armour and wields two weapons similar in appearance to saw-blades on a stick. He is killed by a possessed Dreyfus, alongside Weinheidt and Jillian.

Pleiades of the Azure Sky

The leader of the Pleiades of the Azure Sky and younger brother of King Baltra Liones, Denzel Liones possesses the ability , that uses the opponent's guilt to conjure up the souls of the people they killed to haunt and "judge" them. In a desperate attempt to fight the Ten Commandments, he lets the Goddess Nerobasta possess his body, but tragically, the Goddess is unwilling to help him and both are killed by a furious Derieri.

Deathpierce is the second-in-Command of the Pleiades of the Azure Sky who originated from Edinburgh. Spurred by the circumstances of Denzel's death and the Archangels’ manipulative nature, unable to serve Liones after Meliodas and Elizabeth become its rulers, Deathpierce renounces his title of Holy Knight after the Demon King's defeat and resolves to rebuild Edinburgh as a human-only kingdom under his rule. Deathpierce eventually becomes the antagonist of The Seven Deadly Sins: Grudge of Edinburgh, ending up in solitude after his war declaration on the non-human races forced his subjects to leave Edinburgh, creating an army of Empties to realize his vision.

Arden is the youngest member of the Pleiades. This effect can be applied multiple times, preventing powers which require significant amount of magic from activating.

 Deldry is the only female member of the Pleiades. She is in love with Arden, but he is oblivious of her interests.

Dogedo is a cocky and seemingly arrogant Platinum Holy Knight. He challenges Meliodas to a fight since he did not believed in his strength. After being easily defeated, Deathpierce mentioned that he lost a friend in the battle against Hendrickson. When he recklessly kills a servant turned demon in the presence of Grayroad, the curse of the Commandment drains his life and kills him.

A Platinum-ranked Holy Knight and member of the Pleiades of the Azure Sky, Waillo is also the brother of the late apprentice Holy Knight Twigo. He is greatly infatuated with Deldry, but whether this is genuine affection or an effect of her Love Drive is unknown.

Camelot
Though Camelot was taken over by Zeldris and later destroyed during the battle between the Seven Deadly Sins and the Demon King, Arthur uses his gained powers as the Chaos King to rebuild Camelot as an "everlasting kingdom". Camelot serves as an antagonistic force in the sequel series Four Knights of the Apocalypse, due to the titular group foretold to kill Arthur while his subordinates seek to use the Coffin of Eternal Darkness.

Arthur Pendragon
 

Arthur is the young king of Camelot mentored by Merlin, possessing a great power that even allowed him to fight Hendrickson, but even he is not really sure what this power consists in. He offers Meliodas the position of Great Holy Knight in his kingdom, but Meliodas puts his offer on hold until Liones is saved (and he still has to run the Boar Hat). He later joins the Seven Deadly Sins in their mission against the Ten Commandments, acquiring his familiar Cath in the process. Having admired Meliodas all his life, Arthur becomes disillusioned upon learning he sided with the demons. This spurs him to claim the Holy Sword Excalibur, which gives who it chooses the power and skill of its previous users from the past. Each time a person uses it, their soul moves into the blade making it stronger, and making sure that the next person had to be strong enough to wield it. As such, it showed Arthur's true potential as a "King among Kings" by being chosen by Excalibur. Though Arthur acquires Excalibur, he lacked the skills to properly use it. Cusack uses his Resonant to manipulate Arthur's body into impaling himself with Excalibur. After the Demon King's death, Merlin conducts a ritual to resurrect Arthur as "King of Chaos" with the power to manipulate reality from becoming a vessel of Chaos.
 Becoming the central antagonist of Four Knights of the Apocalypse, having spirited Merlin and the other Camelot survivors to an unknown location, Arthur rebuilt Camelot and seeks to complete his utopia by purging Britannia of the non-human races while seeking out a wife.

Knights of Chaos
The  are a group of Holy Knights that serve King Arthur in the newly created kingdom of Camelot.

Ironside, known as the Red Knight and Ironside the Assassin, is a rogue Holy Knight who believes his actions are for the greater good and is the estranged father of Percival. Having fled Camelot during the Holy War after betraying Arthur, Ironside resumed his position in Camelot's Holy Knights and strived to prevent the prophecy of the Four Knights of the Apocalypse by killing his father Varghese before learning Percival was his intended quarry.

Pellegarde is a Holy Knight of Camelot with the title of Black Knight who takes interest in Percival with intent to train the boy. His magic Blaze lets him conjure blue flames that look their targets until they have been burned to ashes.

Talisker is a Holy Knight of Camelot with the title of Amber Knight who resides in Echo Gorge. He was responsible for turning Nasiens and Dolores' adoptive father Orso into a creature of Chaos, after the laters refusal to no longer give medical treatment to non-human races. His magic Calamity allows him to control the weather. He was later taken out by Percival.

Mortlach is a Holy Knight of Camelot.

Ardbeg is a Holy Knight of Camelot who village was destroyed by demons during the new Holy War with his daughter killed during the raid. Having vowed to purge the demons from Britannia, he was approached by Arthur and joined cause his. His magic Reverse allows him to make any living target within fifty yards to regress to their infant forms. He also commands a Chaos familiar called , which takes to form of a dog named . He manages to trick Anne and Nasiens into removing the barrier that masks a village populated by peaceful demons, sealing away the demons before attempting to kill Percival by using Cernunnos. When it was defeated, Ardbeg flees into the Crystal Grotto where he incapacitates Percival's group with his magic. The Village Elder, revealed to be Gowther in disguise, arrives and reveals that he came to the Grotto in order to be reunited with his daughter. He attempted to threaten Gowther by throwing Percival and Anne off a cliff before Gowther conjured an illusion of the man's daughter to stop him, with Ardbeg realizing that Arthur may not be able to bring back his child as he remembered. Soon after deciding to leave Camelot, Ardbeg sacrifices himself to save Anne from Tamdhu's attack.

Dark Talismans
The  are Holy Knights that serve as elite assassins.

Fiddich is the leader of the Dark talismans who ability Haste allows him to run at super-human speeds. After the other Talismans were defeated by Percival's group, he reveals himself and heals his knights. Fiddich soon realizes that Percival's group only overpowered his subordinates due to Sin's help and attempts to kill the fox, only to force Sin to reveal his true identity as Lancelot before effortlessly killing the other Talismans. Fiddich attempts to flee on his Chaos mount , only to be quickly shot down and killed by Lancelot.

Elgin is a member of the Dark Talismans who ability Wither gradually weakens his targets strength and durability when hit. He was the first of the Talisman's that Percival and his group faced in the Entangled Forrest with the group managing to beat him. He is killed by being shots in his vitals by Lancelot's arrows.

Doronach is a member of the Dark Talismans who ability Impact creates a powerful blast of magic in a fifty foot radius. He fights against Donny who manages to fend him off with his telekinetic powers. He is killed by Lancelot with a blow that ruptures his insides with his corpse being split in half by Fiddich to get to the youth.

Burgie is a sole female member of the Dark Talismans who uses the magic gear Staff of the Four Elements while also possessing the ability Mirage which creates illusionary clones. She fights against Anne who manages to find the real Burgie amongst the clones and are her out. She is killed by being shot in her vitals by Lancelot's arrows.

Tamdhu is a member of the Dark Talismans who ability Homing allows him to coat weapons with magic that can his targets from a far distance. After being hit by Gowther's Invasion: "Jack", he begins attacking his fellow knights until being mercilessly cut down by Fiddich.

Demon Clan
The Demons clan are a race of humanoid beings who were at odds with the Goddess race 3,000 years ago until Meliodas' actions caused his people to wage war against the Goddesses and Stigma, an alliance of the Human, Giant, Fairy races. The demons were sealed away, only to be released into Britannia through the machinations of the demon Fraudrin. The high-ranking Demons possess seven hearts, making them difficult to kill.

The Demon King
 

The Demon King is the progenitor of the Demons and father of Meliodas and Zeldris, along with being the one who cursed Elizabeth with reincarnation. He was created by the entity Chaos like the Supreme Deity to maintain balance in the world, continuing that purpose after sealing their creator away. While physically forced to remain in Purgatory due to his power being potent enough to wipe out Britannia, he fragmented parts of his soul to bestow to the Ten Commandments while conditioning his sons so one of them can become his vessel upon absorbing all the Commandment sigils. During the New Holy War, the Demon King manages to possess Meliodas when he absorbed the Commandments and engages his son in the metaphysical battle while battling his comrades and mortally wounding Zeldris. Though purged from Meliodas, the Demon King's spirit possesses Zeldris's body with Cusack's help before engaging the Seven Deadly Sins in an epic battle. The Demon King is eventually exorcised from Zeldris and is forced to create a body from the surrounding countryside before being destroyed for good by Meliodas, his death breaking the seal that he and the Supreme Deity placed on Chaos.

The Ten Commandments
Ten elite demons selected personally by the Demon King, they were originally led by Meliodas 3000 years prior before he fell in love with Elizabeth, which caused the Holy War. Each of the Ten Commandments can make use of a curse which plays on the virtue that they represent. The Commandments are named after virtues they are branded with, later revealed to be fragments of the Demon King's soul, which play on the nature of their curses. A commandment's sigil passes to whoever defeats the current holder or receives it willingly, with the one who possesses all ten sigils gaining power equal to the Demon King's yet subject to becoming his vessel. The Commandment sigils are eventually destroyed when Meliodas permanently destroys the Demon King.

The Ten Commandments' acting leader and Meliodas' younger brother and twin brother, bearing the sigil of Piety which turns those who turn their back on him into obedient servants to him and the Demon King, by extension. This ability relates to Zeldris' resentment towards Meliodas before betraying their father despite the Demon King's still wanting his older brother to become the new Demon King. Though having acquired the other sigils, Zeldris gives them to Meliodas after his brother promised to use his power as Demon King to revive the vampire Gelda whom Zeldris developed feeling for. But Zeldris realizes the truth of the Demon King's succession as he is mortally wounded helping the Deadly Sins save Meliodas from the Demon King's possession. But Cusack unknowingly makes Zeldris his father's new body in the aftermath of the New Holy War. Luckily, the Deadly Sins manage to free Zeldris as he and a revived Gelda take their leave after the Demon King is destroyed. Zeldris returns to the aid the Sins during the events of the epilogue film The Seven Deadly Sins: Cursed by Light.

 An upper-class demon resembling a purple spiked giant with a mouth on his chest, he was previously a general during the ancient war before being promoted to a substitute Commandment following Gowther's disappearance, despite not receiving the Demon King's soul fragment representing Selflessness. Fraudrin is the cause of the Danafall Kingdom's destruction, having accidentally been released from the Coffin of Eternal Darkness together with other low-class demons, only to be nearly killed when Meliodas' rage vaporized the kingdom after Fraudrin murdered Liz. This forced a weakened Fraudrin to possess the body of Dreyfus when he and Hendrickson were sent to investigate the ruins, using the two humans in a scheme to get revenge on Meliodas while bringing the rest of the demons back to Britannia. Pretending to be Dreyfus until the Ten Commandments were freed, he developed an emotional attachment to Dreyfus' son Griamore as a result; Fraudrin rejoins the group to replenish his strength while revealing his substitute status while in the Pleiades of the Azure Sky's custody. During the Commandments' attack on Liones, Zaratras and Hendrickson eventually exorcise Fraudrin with the demon ending up fighting Meliodas. Fraudrin attempts to self-destruct and take Liones with him but stops at Griamore's pleas, realizing Meliodas' motivation for betraying their people and allowing him to end his life.

 The normally laid-back adopted brother of Zeldris and Meliodas, possessing a version of the latter's Full Counter ability that allows him to reflect physical attacks. Estarossa is later revealed to be originally Archangel  of the Goddess Race who possess the Grace  which increases his power while exposed to sunlight. Being among those who slaughtered unarmed demons at the start of the Holy War, Mael's identity was rewritten by the Commandant Gowther to have him take Meliodas' place in the Ten Commandants as the holder of the Demon King's soul fragment representing , enabling him to nullify any damage by those with hatred in their hearts. But traces of Estarossa's former identity linger as retain his love for Elizabeth and his deep-seated grudge toward Meliodas for stealing her heart, which strengthened his false memories.
 Being easily defeated by a fully powered Escanor during the siege of Liones since his opponent did not harbour any hatred towards him, Estarossa learns of Zeldris's alliance with Meliodas to make the latter the new Demon King and acts against them by taking Galand and Monspeet's Commandments. The result causes Estarossa's mind and body to become unstable while returning to his true identity as Mael, deciding to make Gowther suffer for his role in his creator's spell by killing his friends and absorb Derieri's Commandment while killing her, Oslo, Tariel, and Sariel in the resulting battle. After being defeated by King and Gowther managing to help him expel the commandments, Mael uses a spell to enable Oslo and Derieri to reincarnate with their memories intact. Mael then joins the Deadly Sins to end the new Holy War and stop the Demon King to atone for his role in the previous Holy War, regaining Sunshine from Escanor before bestowing it back to the human during the Sins' final battle with the Demon King. Mael returns during the events of the epilogue film The Seven Deadly Sins: Cursed by Light when his revived kindsmen attack Liones on the Supreme Deity's command, attempting to stop them.

A snake who became a pink-haired naja demon from bathing in miasma for years, possessing a composed yet mocking personality. She possesses the Commandment of Faith, which burns the eyes of anyone who loses faith or doubts their convictions in her presence. She uses her aura to summon the souls of the dead in order to create a zombie army to wipe out humans and can summon lesser demons as well. When the reanimated Elaine resists her control, she and Galand pursue her, Ban, and Jericho to Escanor's bar. After getting inebriated by owner's beer, Melascula witnesses Galand's defeat against Escanor and ends up horrifically burned in her attempt to swallow the human's soul. Though healed by Gloxinia while joining the other Ten Commandments into overpowering Meliodas, Melascula gets her jaw dislocated by Ban with most of her hearts destroyed. She is later sent to Coland to maintain a barrier around Camelot, trapping Meliodas in a Dark Cocoon while using Coland's restless dead against the other Sins and Elaine. But she is ultimately defeated and purified back into a normal snake by Elizabeth, with Merlin trapping the powerless Melascula in a test tube to study her prior to losing her Commandment.
She infiltrates Liones with Galand's severed head before reviving him to enact both Arthur's orders for the Four Knights to be killed along with her revenge on the Deadly Sins. After being defeated by Tristan, Melascula is forced to fuse with Galand to become  in a final attempt for the demons to fulfill their mission.

A gangly and arrogant demon clad in a red steel-armor and armed with a halberd. Galand possesses the fragment of the Demon King's soul representing  which petrifies whomsoever lies in his presence, including himself should he break a promise. After being revived, through not yet back at full power, Galand decides to attack Camelot as a warm-up upon learning Meliodas is there. Subjecting Merlin to his commandment's power when she attempts to stall for time after he killed most of Camelot's knights, Galand takes his leave after Gowther manipulates him into thinking that he killed the Deadly Sins and Slader. After being easily overpowered by Meliodas after he regains his full powers, Galand accompanies Melascula to Raven, where they begin to hunt Ban, Jericho, and Elaine. The search takes the demons to My Sweet Gluttony, with Galand showing his love for alcohol and challenging Escanor to a "game" in which the two would take turns hitting each other with their weapons until one would end up dead. Despite being split in half by the Sin of Pride, he regenerates and uses his most powerful ability "Critical Over" to try and finish off Escanor, only to see that his attack barely managed to scratch him. Galand ignores Melascula's warnings out of pride before attempting to flee as Escanor was about to finish him and is petrified as a result. Galand remained conscious and is later found by Estarossa, who shatters him in order to acquire his Commandment. 
 In Four Knights of the Apocalypse, Galand's head was retrieved by King Arthur and given to Melascula for her to revive with the power of chaos. He is brought back as an armorless and muscular version of himself called  to carry out Arthur's orders to kill the Four Knights of the Apocalyse while acting on his own desire to enact revenge on the Deadly Sins. After Galand is defeated by Gawain and Percival, his body is fused with Melascula's to form Melagaland in the demons' last ditch effort to fulfill their mission.

A sophisticated, human-looking demon with a thin moustache and purple hair, able to utilize long-range flame magic in the form of birds. He's a gentleman of sorts and is usually close to Derieri. He possesses the Commandment of Reticence, which prevents him from verbally expressing his true feelings of love towards Derieri with her unaware of it. He and Derieri went into hiding after being defeated by Meliodas, taking refuge in a small cabin near a village with the resolve to no longer partake in the fighting. But the two are attacked by Estarossa with Monspeet sacrificing himself so Derieri can escape.

A female demon with spiky, unruly hair who is naked save for a few patches of darkness covering parts of her body. She has a crude, yet carefree personality and often prefaces her comments with "the bottom line is" which Monspeet often expands on in a long-winded fashion. She possesses the Commandment of Purity, which inflicts those who commit impure deeds with disease. She is a formidable physical combatant, gaining additional power the longer she launches consecutive blows at an enemy. She expresses a deep-seated hatred towards the Goddess clan for one of them killing her older sister among several noncombatant demons that they held hostage. As a result, she and Monspeet each gave up six of their seven hearts to temporary become Induras, increasing their power at the cost of being easily killed by an opponent. She and Monspeet are later beaten by Meliodas, shortly after he re-awakened and are seen later relaxing in a small cabin, hiding their identities as Demons. Having lost her will to fight, Derieri decides to go to Camelot and return her Commandment to Zeldris, but Estarossa finds them first. Monspeet manages to save her from being killed by launching her away from Estarossa, conveniently sending her to where the assault team composed of Holy Knights, the Four Archangels, and the Seven Deadly Sins are fending off a demon attack.
When Estarossa spirits Elizabeth away, Derieri offers her help to King, Sariel, and Tauriel in retrieving her. She comes up with a plan to hold Estarossa once he is revealed as Mael from the Goddess clan by working as a team with Gowther, King, and the rest. However, she dies after Mael blows out her last heart in the battle, which results in her commandment being absorbed as well. In the afterlife, she is thankful to Elizabeth as she finally learns about Monspeet's feelings for her. After Mael is saved from the commandments, he uses a spell to allow Oslo's and Derieri's souls keep their memories of their previous lives in their next reincarnation.
 The events of Four Knights of the Apocalypse reveal that Derieri reincarnated as a human mage named , serving in Liones under Elizabeth.

Drole is founding king of the Giant Race also known to the humans as Balor, revered by his people for developing a sacred dance and valor in battle despite being shunned as child for his four arms, grayish-blue skin, and  his gouged-out left eye. While he initially participated in the Holy War as a member of Stigmata, Drole joined the demons alongside Gloxinia after submitting to Zeldris and joining the Ten Commandments. He replaces a member Meliodas killed as the holder of the Commandment of Patience, which inflicts those intolerant of pain with further pain. Drole later takes an interest in Diana when he and Gloxinia turn Vaizel into a gigantic labyrinth in order to gather fighters and attract the Seven Deadly Sins, later testing King and Diane by having them enact their roles in the Holy War to see if they made the right choice. Diane selecting the opinion to run away rather than submit or die fighting convinces Drole to leave the Ten Commandments alongside Gloxinia. He is killed by Chandler while he and Gloxinia try to protect the Seven Deadly Sins.

 The first Fairy King and member of Stigma, who was assumed to have been killed by the Demon King during the Ancient War. In reality, Gloxinia allied himself with the demons after believing his unconscious sister Gerharde was killed by a human ally named Rou, whom he killed after some Stigma members attacked his homeland. Gloxinia replaces a previous Commandant Meliodas killed as holder of the fragment of the Demon King's soul representing Repose, which seals away the magic of those who fight without rest. He wields the Spirit Spear Basquias, which constantly covers him in the form of tentacles and that has a versatile set of abilities similar to those of King's Chastiefol, but at a much higher level of potency and destructiveness. He and Drole take an interest in King and Diane, testing them by having them enact their role in the Holy War to see if they made the right choice. King's choice to spare Rou rather than give into rage convinces Gloxinia to leave the Ten Commandments alongside Drole, sending their Commandments back to Zeldris. He and Drole are killed by Chandler when they try to protect the fleeing Seven Deadly Sins.

Grayroad is a queen-caste mutated Gray Demon composed of multiple dwarf-sized masks shrouded in a miasma-like flames, able to shape-shift into any form and turn humans into low-level demons. She possesses the fragment of the Demon King's soul representing Pacifism, causing anyone who kills in her presence to forfeit their remaining years and immediately age to death. She also commands powerful cursing magic that automatically returns her target to the location at which she cursed them, preventing them from escaping her. Grayroad ends up becoming one of Merlin's test subjects when the witch proves herself to be immune to Grayroad's commandment and is captured in a test tube after attempting to flee.

A Demon sorcerer and Merlin's mentor who was forced to bear the Demon King's soul fragment representing Selflessness and subsequently imprisoned for five centuries when he refused to fight for the Demon King. Prior to his imprisonment, he created a proxy body in the likeness of his lover Glariza to observe the outside world until he used the Ancient War to orchestrate his escape with the intent of ending the conflict through a ritual to alter the identity of Archangel Mael into Estarossa, selecting him for being Glariza's killer.  But the large demand of magical energy needed for the ritual's success kills Gowther, passing his commandment and name on to his creation who joins the Seven Deadly Sins three millennia later.

Original Demon

The Original Demon is a centaur-like demon that Demon King had created as his adviser and ended up splitting into two separate beings as punishment for attempting to overthrow him during a revolt. The two halves of the Original Demons, Chandler and Cusack, are instilled with the need to mentor the Demon King's sons Meliodas and Zeldris as the Demon King's heirs with both unaware of how the succession works. The Original Demon is briefly restored during the New Holy War when Chandler and Cusack regain memories of their original self and cancel the Demon king's division curse, taking use of the double-edged effect of his ability Crisis as his restoration is slowly killing him. But he is defeated by Mael, whose attack restored the Demon King's spell and splintered him back into his two components.

An extremely powerful high-class demon and Meliodas' former mentor, titled as the "Pacifier Demon" from apparently sucking the marrow from his victims' bones. Chandler shows an obsession for Meliodas as he blames Elizabeth for his apprentice's betrayal while refusing to acknowledge anyone else as the next Demon King. He normally appears as an old man with a demon mark on the right side of his face, extremely proficient in magic and having taught Meloidas the Full Counter technique. While enraged, he becomes immensely muscular with his hair and eyes blackened and dragon-like wings sprouting from his back. In this form, Chandler is powerful to overwhelm the Deadly Sins on his own and conjure the daylight obscuring "True Night". Chandler is killed in the aftermath of the New Holy War by Cusack after the two briefly merged back into their original form.

An extremely powerful high-class demon and Zeldris' mentor, titled the "Napping Reaper" with his power imposing enough to instill fear in Excalibur. Cusack generally appears a relatively young man with a long mustache, having a somewhat condescending demeanor as he usually fights those who interest him or provide a challenge. Much like Chandler, Cusack is obsessed with Zeldris to the point of love. In his true demon form, his hair whitens as he sprouts dragon's wings while his arms lengthen with his hands enlarged enough to hold his two swords with only one. Cusack kills off Chandler in the aftermath of the New Holy War and is later killed by the Demon King after unknowingly turning Zeldris into his vessel.

Lower Class Demons

The lowest class of demons seen thus far, they are massive red obese-looking creatures that can breathe Purgatory Fire, which has far greater potency than normal fire. They also possess two hearts, making them difficult to kill. A red demon was first seen invading the Fairy King's forest twenty years prior, where it burned down the forest and killed Elaine before Ban slew it with it the aid of his newly acquired immortality. Its corpse was eventually found by Hendrickson, who uses its blood to create Holy Knights with the powers of demons, a process perfected in the New Generation.

These demons have thick gray-coloured carapaces that make them extremely durable, faces surrounded by pointed petal-like protrusions vaguely resembling a stylized sun or flower, and wings. In addition to breathing Purgatory Fire, they can utilize various darkness-based attacks, such as "Dark Snow", an attack that consists in conjuring up black snow-like particles which kill instantly. After being cornered and nearly defeated by five of the Sins, Hendrickson consumes the blood of a Gray Demon to vastly increase his strength and continue the battle.

Bird-like demons with muscular physiques, they are known for their speed. Four of them summoned by Melascula's powers, they are eventually all killed off.

 Demon-made golems that served as war machines during the Holy War, rendered dormant when the Demons were sealed until they reactivate when the Ten Commandments are released. They have a power level of 5500, making them effectively as strong as Hendrickson after he acquires the powers of the Gray Demon. Like the lower-class Demons, they can breathe Purgatory Fire. They can also sprout additional appendages from their heads to launch additional attacks. Their only weakness is a core embedded in their chest. Two of them have appeared so far: a fat one that attacked Camelot, which Meliodas destroys and a taller, thinner one with long limbs that appeared at the revived Fairy King's forest before it is destroyed by King's unleashed Chastiefol.

The Vampires of Edinburgh
The Vampire Race are among the creatures birthed from the Mother of Chaos, serving the Demon race as vassals during the Holy War. But the Vampire King Izraf attempted a coup that ends in failure, with the Demon King using this as an excuse to force Zeldris into killing his love Gelda. But Zeldris instead sealed the vampires away in a sarcophagus rather than execute them. But the vampires were freed 12 years prior to the inception of the story, taking over the Kingdom of Edinburgh before they were all killed with the exception of Orlandi, whom Merlin captured and turned into a bat creature in service to Camelot, and Gelda, whom Meliodas resealed before being freed and reunited with Zeldris.

Goddess Race
One of the five races of Britannia that are Demon Race's equals and are led by the Supreme Deity. Three millennia ago, as a result of Elizabeth falling in love with Meliodas, the Goddess Race declared war on the Demon with support from the humans, the giants, and the fairies. Though they won the war by using the Coffin of Eternal Darkness after the demon mage Gowther altered their memories that Mael was killed, the Supreme Deity was sealed away while the other members of the Goddess Race lose their physical forms. Following the return of the Demons, members of the Goddess Race begin to resurface and gather for a new Holy War.

Supreme Deity

The progenitor of the Goddess Race and Elizabeth's mother in her first life, created by Chaos along with the Demon King and the Sacred Tree for the purpose of maintaining balance through her conflict with the former. The Supreme Deity took offense to Chaos creating the human race as she and the Demon King formed an alliance to seal away their creator, encouraging their races into conflict over dominion over the world. Despite her rivalry with the Demon King, the Supreme Deity joined him in destroying Belialuin for Merlin making fools of them and later cursing their children near the end of the Holy War. But Merlin and Gowther of Selflessness arranged events that sealed the Supreme Deity when she uses the Coffin of Eternal Darkness to imprison the demons. She serves as the antagonist in the epilogue film The Seven Deadly Sins: Cursed by Light, freed from her seal months after the Demon King's demise with the intent to kill the Sins and their allies before renewing the Holy War. But she ends up destroyed by Meliodas and Zeldris.

Ludociel

One of the Four Archangels of the Goddess Race who possesses the Grace , allowing him to move at speeds that make him appear to be teleporting. While polite with a desire for peace, Ludociel hates demons enough he lied to Meliodas of wanting peace between their peoples and willfully using Elizabeth as a distraction so he and his younger brother Mael can slaughter the unarmed demons they took hostage. Like his kin, he was made to believe Mael was killed by Estarossa. In the present day, Ludociel was sealed within an altar before he possesses the body of Margaret Liones by promising to help her rescue Gilthunder. He then proceeds to gather new Stigma members for the new Holy War.
He eventually leads Merlin, Escanor, Hendrickson and Gilthunder in order to stop Meliodas becoming the new demon king. He even states that he can not allow Meliodas to live after their victory. He fights Zeldris and defeat him as he teams with Escanor. But once remembering Mael and Estrarossa are the same person, Ludociel ends being purged from Margaret's body when Hendrickson took advantage of the Archangel's moment of weakness. Though Hendrickson offer his body for Ludociel, he heals the human instead and continues fighting in his partially restored physical form against the Original Demon before reuniting with Mael as sacrifices himself and Deadly Sins fight the Demon King's attack and fades away soon after the battle ends.

Tarmiel

A three-headed member of the Four Archangels who possesses the Grace , allowing him to conjure ocean to snare his opponents or liquefy his body. Three millennia after the ancient war, Tarmiel ended up sealed within the staff of Arbus whom he possessed after the man was killed by demons and joins Ludoshel in forming a new Stigma. Having regained enough of his original form to fight alongside Sariel against Estarossa, Tarmiel was briefly conflicted to fight him after learning he is Mael before being taken out by Mael's attack barrage.

Sariel

A child-like member of the Four Archangels who possesses the Grace , allowing him to manipulate wind. Three millennia after the ancient war, Sariel ended up sealed within the lute of a girl named Solaseed. Sariel tricks Solaseed into allowing him to use her body until he is able to reconstitute enough of his physical form, tricking her with the promise of curing her illness. Sariel then joins Ludoshel in forming a new Stigma. While he and Tarmiel battle Estarossa, latter learning him to be Mael, Sariel is forced to leave Solaseed's body after his Grace began affecting her via accelerated growth into an adult woman. Sariel is then fatally wounded by Mael and fades away in Tarmiel's arms.

Nerobasta

A member of Goddess race who ended up sealed within Denzel Liones' sword in the aftermath of the ancient war which she participated. Despite Denzel's sacrifice allowing her to take possession of his body, she shows no care for or empathy towards humans. When confronted by Derieri for her brutal murder of demon hostages, she shows cowardice by claiming that she just followed orders and tries to flee. This enrages the Commandment and Nerobasta begs for her life, only for the demon to kill her along with Denzel.

Other characters

Hawk's Mother

Hawk's mother is a massive green pig who transports the Boar Hat on her back. When she finds a suitable location to place the bar, she burrows away underground, leaving only the bar peeking out from the surface. Unlike Hawk she is unable to speak, but surprisingly powerful and able to beat Red and Grey Demons with ease and even consume Monspeet's fiery attack without any ill effects. Hawk's Mother would later be revealed to be a shell of moss that the Demon King and the Supreme Deity used to seal Chaos within, known as the Mother of Chaos from which numerous monsters and the vampire royalty were birthed from. Once the seal was broken and Arthur became the King of Chaos, Hawk's Mother breaks apart as Chaos transferred into the human.

Elaine

Elaine held this post for 700 years after King had left in search of his best friend, Helbram. She has the power to control Nature and the wind in her environment. During her time protecting the fountain, she met Ban, who coveted the fountain, but they ended up growing close to each other. Both she and Ban were mortally wounded by a demon that destroyed the Fairy King Forest, and Elaine used gave Ban the water of the fountain, so he could survive and create a new forest for her people. After her death, Elaine's soul resides in the  dimension until she is revived by Melascula; consumed by her regret and unable to control her actions, she attacked Jericho as she did not look kindly upon her feelings towards and the time she was spending with Ban. But Jericho and Ban manage to help Elaine break free of her negative emotions, with remaining among the living due to Melascula's spell. Like King, Elaine grows a pair of wings as a sign of her power growth as she helps the Sins defeat Melascula.
After Ban goes to purgatory to find Meliodas' emotions, she fights along with Holy Knights as she waits for Ban; in the midst of the battle, she starts dying again, but Ban uses his new powers to fully resurrect her at the cost of his immortality.

Cath

A mysterious cat-like creature that Arthur acquired as a familiar during his training in Istal, keeping him alive while in constant physical contact. But Cath actually is a spawn of Chaos named , an embodiment of avarice and destruction that cannot be killed by any means. Cath desires to become the King of Chaos and only protected Arthur in order to eat him once he was resurrected as the vessel of Chaos. Cath devours Arthur's arm to acquire a fragment of Chaos with the Deadly Sins keeping him at bay until Arthur decides to use his power to absorb Cath back into the Chaos he was created from.

Oslo

A Black Hound and King's pet, Oslo is able to alter his size, with his mouth serving as a portal, while his growling can be understood by King, Elaine, and Hawk. But his rage wavered when he protects a mortally wounded Gerheade, who reminded him of a girl he loved, and allowed himself to be killed by an enraged Gloxinia. Rou reincarnated into Oslo soon after to continue his vow of protecting Gerheade. Oslo sacrifices his life when Mael tries to attack King with a blast, however, his soul is enchanted by Mael so he can retain his memories of his previous life in his next reincarnation.

Lady of the Lake

Following the Demon King's death, Merlin brings Arthur's body to Lake Salisbury to be revived by the Lady as a "King of Chaos". After Meliodas demands answers for Merlin's actions of reviving Arthur as a vessel of chaos, the Lady reveals the witch's full story and goals to him and the other Sins.

Cain Barzard

Cain Barzard is an elderly man who led the Deadly Sins to the Vaizel annual fighting festival which he also participates in, revealed to be a Danafall knight and an old comrade from Meliodas's time in Danafall. During their match, having assumed he was fighting Meliodas's son, Cain goes all out while demanding why he destroyed their kingdom. But once Meliodas convinces him that he never betrayed Danafall, Cain accepts the truth and forfeits the match. Cain later visits the Boar Hat and provides Meliodas with Liz's sword.

Jenna
.

One of the head druids alongside her younger twin sister Zaneri in their sacred land Istal, the two revealed to be members of the Goddess Race who deserted during the ancient war in disgust of their kind's conduct. The two came upon a pair of twin sisters on the verge of death and earned their permission to possess their bodies, allowing them to escape the conflict undetected. Energetic and teasing compared to Zaneri, Jenna shows interest in outsiders while supervising the druids' physical training which she placed Arthur, King, and Holy Knights members through in preparation for their battle against the Ten Commandments.

Zaneri

The other head of the Druids and Jenna's younger twin sister, having possessed the body of one of a set dying twins alongside her sister to escape the ancient war undetected. Unlike her energetic and cheerful sister, Zaneri is very serious at her job as head Druid while overseeing the druids' mental training which she placed Meliodas and Elizabeth through. Zaneri also has a fondness toward Meliodas, but understands her feelings to be one-sided while fearing for him should Elizabeth die.

Matrona

The warrior chief of the Giant Clan and Diane and Dolores' mentor. Known as the Fang of the Great Earth, Matrona is a proud giantess, willing to go into battle for payment and merciless toward her enemies, but at the same time, honouring and showing respect towards her opponent once they haven given her a good battle. She was a friend of Diane's parents and took care of her after they had passed, but her tough personality made them clash a lot. When she and Diane were hired by a group of Liones Holy Knights, the knights deceived them and tried to kill them to gain prestige. She saved Diane from a poisonous arrow and used the last of her strength to take down the Holy Knights before supposedly dying. However, she somehow survived and appears just in time to save Diane from Galand and Monspeet. Though the incident cost her her right leg (which she replaced with a peg leg), she was rescued and nursed to health by Zalpa, a barbarian that Diane had spared prior to the incident with the knights. Having been saved, her overall outlook on things changed and now she helps him raise his kids Della and Sol. When her adoptive children fall ill, she accompanies Diane in a search for a cure, joining the tournament prepared by Drole and Gloxinia.

Zhivago

A werefox who was imprisoned in Aberdeen Prison and who raised Ban in his youth and taught him how to steal. He treated Ban like his own son. He also told Ban of the Fountain of Youth in the Fairy King's Forest. One day, he was forced to choose to save either Ban from people who had captured him, or his son Selion from a group of hunters. He chose the latter but came too late and Selion died in his arms, and as a result, he believed he had lost them both.
30 years later, Ban and Jericho find him fallen ill and on the brink of death, and after he tells them his story, Ban recognises him and reveals his identity to his foster father. After a brief, but heartwarming reunion, Zhivago passes away. He later sacrifices his soul to save Ban's soul from being eaten by Galand, despite knowing that he would never see his son Selion again as a result.

Dubs 

 
 

A craftsman of the Giant Race whom Merlin commissioned to create the Coffin of Eternal Darkness, also revealed to have created many other weapons like Meloidas's Lostvayne. He appears in the epilogue film The Seven Deadly Sins: Cursed by Light as one of the antagonists while under the Supreme Deity's control, supplying weapons to maintain Dahlia's spell in those they enthralled to their cause.

Guinevere
 
 A princess from Cameliard, a small country near where Camelot was originally located, who was forced to leave her homeland after awakening an ability to see into the future. She recently journeyed to Liones to meet Lancelot, whom she believes is her predestined lover.

References

External links
Character profiles at Kodansha USA

Seven Deadly Sins, The
Characters